partypoker (formerly stylized PartyPoker) is an online poker card room. Launched in 2001 by PartyGaming, the site has had up to 80,000 players logged-in and was the largest online card room until 2006. In 2011 PartyGaming merged with bwin to form Bwin.Party Digital Entertainment. As of 2017, it remains among the largest online poker card rooms. The site was endorsed by Mike Sexton, the former host of the World Poker Tour television show. The domain partypoker.com attracted at least 3.6 million visitors annually by 2008 according to a Compete.com study. In 2016, after a protracted bidding process between 888 Holdings and GVC Holdings, Bwin.Party Digital Entertainment accepted GVC Holdings' bid for £1.1 billion. Today, the site is run by GVC Holdings and is available in 14 different languages. In addition to partypoker.com, partypoker also offers dedicated networks for French and Italian based players via partypoker.fr and partypoker.it, respectively. GVC Holdings also acquired Partycasino during the 2011 merger of Party Gaming.

partypoker offers a wide variety of different tournaments with different prize levels for single-table tournaments as well as multi-table tournaments. partypoker's Sit & Go tournaments run 24 hours a day and players can register for tournaments with entry fees starting at $1, and ranging in size from 2 to 50 players.

Cash games
The games include Texas Hold 'em (No Limit and Fixed), Omaha and Omaha Hi-Lo, 7 Card Stud and 7 Card Stud Hi-Lo. The stakes can range from .01/.02 to $100/$200. In 2012 partypoker removed its high-stakes cash games with the highest stakes at $10/$20.

Party Poker formerly offered a bad beat jackpot.

partypoker also offers FastForward cash game format. Every player is automatically re-seated to another random table immediately after they fold their hand or after the hand is over. This format is very popular by players and poker rooms. It is faster and offers a higher level of security as it is a lot more difficult for two or more players to participate in collusion.

Tournaments
The site offers a variety of tournaments, ranging from 10 to thousands of participants. Single-table and multi-table sit n' go tournaments are offered as well as scheduled tournaments.

partypoker hosts the partypoker Million. This tournament begins with online qualifiers, but the final stages are held at actual poker tables aboard a cruise ship. The winners of previous Party Poker Million events were Kathy Liebert, Howard Lederer, Erick Lindgren, and Michael Gracz.

History
partypoker was the largest online card room until 2006 when it left the US market due to the Unlawful Internet Gambling Enforcement Act of 2006. PokerStars has since claimed the title.

In 2014, partypoker plans on returning to the US market for real money players, but on March 1, 2017, it still does not accept US players except for the state of New Jersey.

In 2015, partypoker partnered with Dusk Till Dawn and later hosted "The partypoker Grand Prix".

In 2017, the casino hosted the partypokerLIVE MILLIONS Dusk Till Dawn festival. The £5,300 main event generated a prize pool of £6,017,395. Maria Lampropulos won the main event earning £1,000,000. The £10,300 High Roller event was won by Vojtech Ruzicka, earning him US$363,135.

In February 2018, partypoker relaunched their Team Online, with Matthew Staples first to be signed. The new measures extend across all of the countries in which it operates with brands including Bwin, PartyPoker, Ladbrokes, Coral, FoxyBingo and BetMGG.

In December 2020, GVC holdings, who own PartyPoker, changed their name to Entain in a global rebrand. The new measures extend across all of the countries in which it operates with brands including bwin, PartyPoker, Ladbrokes, Coral, FoxyBingo and BetMGM and their affiliate programs.

In May 2021, PartyPoker and PartyCasino entered a new multi-year partnership with McLaren Racing.

Televised events
partypoker hosts two televised events:

A cash game known as the partypoker The Big Game and the partypoker Premier League a tournament structure league.

References

External links
Official site
partypoker.net
partypoker.fr
partypoker.ru 

Entain
Online poker companies
Gambling companies established in 2001
Internet properties established in 2001